Operational Command North is a command of the Ukrainian Ground Forces in northern Ukraine. It was formed in 2013 from the Western Operational Command and Territorial Directorate North by reforming the 13th Army Corps.

The operation command traces its history back to Territorial Directorate "North",  which was created on the basis of Northern Territorial Operational Command by Directive No.322/1/010 of the Minister of Defence of Ukraine on 20 May 2005.

The previous Northern Operational Command was created in 1996 and based on the 1st Army Corps that continued the traditions of the 1st Guard Red-Banner Army. It encompassed six oblasts: Poltava, Sumy, Kyiv, Zhytomyr, Chernihiv, and Cherkasy. The command consisted of units and military formations of the 8th Army Corps.

On 15 August 2005, temporary Chief of the Directorate Colonel Yuriy Horoliuk signed the first Order within the Directive. This day is considered the creation date for the Directorate. The Territorial Directorate "North" was the first to switch to a new system of control.

History
When Ukraine gained independence, the 1st Guards Army was stationed on Ukrainian territory with its headquarters at Chernihiv. During the early 1990s, the army was reformed into the 1st Army Corps. In 1996, the Northern Operational and Territorial Command was formed from the corps. At the beginning of 1998, the command was split into the Northern Operational Command, managing operations in the area. The Northern Territorial Command controlled other functions. In August 2005, Territorial Directorate "North" was established from the Northern Operational Command. 
 		 	
The oblasts (provinces) of Kharkiv, Poltava, Sumy, Kyiv, Zhytomyr, Chernihiv, and Cherkasy were all are under the Directorate control. The Directorate was in charge of the 7 oblasts and Kyiv City Military Commissariat, 135 regional military commissariats, 530 military units and bases. As of 2008, the mission of the directorate was to organize territorial defence, recruit conscripts and contract soldiers and manage infrastructure.

In November 2013, the directorate was reformed into Operational Command North. The command absorbed units of the disbanded 13th Army Corps.

Current structure 

Operational Command North has operational command of ground force units in Poltava, Sumy, Kyiv, Zhytomyr, Chernihiv, and Cherkasy oblasts, as well as in the city of Kyiv.

 Operational Command North, Chernihiv
 1st Tank Brigade, Honcharivske
 30th Mechanized Brigade, Zviahel
 58th Motorized Brigade, Konotop
 72nd Mechanized Brigade, Bila Tserkva
 26th Artillery Brigade, Berdychiv
 1129th Anti-aircraft Missile Regiment, Bila Tserkva
 5th Signal Regiment, Chernihiv
 12th Engineer Regiment, Zviahel
 50th Maintenance Regiment, Huiva
 12th Tank Battalion, Honcharivske
 20th Electronic Warfare Battalion, Zhytomyr
 54th Reconnaissance Battalion, Zviahel
 181st Logistic Support Battalion, Zviahel
 226th Transport Battalion, Berdichev
 134th Security & Service Battalion, Chernihiv
 90th Command & Intelligence Center, Chernihiv
 367th Information & Signal Center, Chernihiv
 Regional Radioelectronic Intelligence (REI) Center, Chernihiv
 121st Maneuverable REI Center, Chernihiv
 122nd REI Center, Chuguev

Additionally the following major ground combat formations of other branches of the Ukrainian Armed Forces, respectively the ground forces, are based in the area of Operational Command North:

 Ground Forces:
 27th Rocket Artillery Brigade "Sumy", in Sumy
 43rd Heavy Artillery Brigade, in Pereiaslav
 18th Army Aviation Brigade, in Poltava
 107th Rocket Artillery Regiment, in Kremenchuk
 Air Assault Forces:
 46th Air Assault Brigade, in Poltava
 95th Air Assault Brigade, in Zhytomyr
 Air Forces:
 96th Anti-aircraft Missile Brigade, in Danylivka
 156th Anti-aircraft Missile Regiment, in Zolotonosha
 Territorial Defense Forces
 112th Territorial Defense Brigade
 114th Territorial Defense Brigade
 115th Territorial Defense Brigade
 116th Territorial Defense Brigade
 117th Territorial Defense Brigade
 118th Territorial Defense Brigade
 119th Territorial Defense Brigade

Commanders 
This table includes commanders of Northern Operational Command (1992–2005), Territorial Directorate "North" (2005–2013) and Operational Command North (2014–).

See also
 Kyiv Military District

References

Military units and formations of Ukraine
Military units and formations established in 1996
North
1996 establishments in Ukraine